Gilgal is an Israeli settlement organized as a kibbutz in the West Bank. Located in the Jordan Valley around 16 kilometres north of Jericho with an area of 1,400 dunams, it falls under the jurisdiction of Bik'at HaYarden Regional Council.

The international community considers Israeli settlements in the West Bank illegal under international law, but the Israeli government disputes this.

History
Gilgal was established in 1970 as a Nahal settlement, and was named for the ancient biblical site of Gilgal. It was converted to a civilian kibbutz in 1973.

According to ARIJ, in order to construct Gilgal, Israel confiscated land in 1970 from two Palestinian villages: 858 dunams from Fasayil, and 268 dunams from Al-Auja.
https://books.google.co.uk/books?id=5FHWeuU-5ucC&q=Gilgal#v=onepage&q=Gii'gal&f=false

Economy
Gilgal has invested millions of dollars in state-of-the-art water technology to boost its production of medjool dates. The system is based on the utilization of wastewater.

Climate

See also
Gilgal I, early Neolithic site (11,400–11,200 BP) near the kibbutz, with earliest findings of fig tree cultivation in the world
Judean date palm

References

Kibbutzim
Kibbutz Movement
Nahal settlements
Israeli settlements in the West Bank
Populated places established in 1970
1970 establishments in the Israeli Military Governorate